Warsill is a settlement and civil parish in the Harrogate district, in the county of North Yorkshire, England. In 1961 the population of the parish was 42. The population was estimated at 70 in 2015.

Warsill was historically an extra parochial area. It became a civil parish in 1858. Today it shares a grouped parish council with Bishop Thornton.

The toponym, first recorded in 1132 as Warthsala, probably derives from the Old English weard sæl, meaning "watch castle".  In the Middle Ages there was a grange of Fountains Abbey here, and Warsill Hall Farmhouse, a 17th-century Grade II listed building, now stands on its site.

References 

Villages in North Yorkshire
Civil parishes in North Yorkshire
Borough of Harrogate